Alerce Andino National Park is located in the Andes, in Los Lagos Region of Chile. This national park covers about 393 km2. It is bounded by the  Reloncaví Estuary on its east and south sides, and by the Reloncaví Sound to the west (excluding a coastal fringe of a few km). To its north lies Chapo Lake.

The park contains about 50 lakes and natural ponds.

Management of this and other national parks in Chile is entrusted to Corporacion Nacional Forestal, CONAF.

Flora
The centerpiece of this lush and mountainous protected area are the Fitzroya cupressoides (locally known as Alerce) forests, which consist of pure and mixed stands comprising a total surface of about 200 km2.

Fauna
The park provides important habitat for species such as pudú and monito del monte.

References

 Parque Nacional Alerce Andino
 Greenpeace Chile

National parks of Chile
Protected areas of Los Lagos Region
Valdivian temperate rainforest
Protected areas established in 1982
1982 establishments in Chile
1982 in Chilean law